Whitten may refer to:

People
 Whitten (surname)

Places
 Whitten, Iowa, United States
 Whitten Peak, Antarctica
 Jamie Whitten Lock and Dam, located on the Tennessee–Tombigbee Waterway in Tishomingo County, Mississippi
 Jamie L. Whitten Building, administration building of the U.S. Department of Agriculture

Sports
 E. J. Whitten Legends Game, annual charity Australian rules football All-star game,
 E. J. Whitten Medal, awarded to the best Victorian player in an Australian rules football State of Origin football match
 Whitten Oval, stadium located in Melbourne, Victoria, Australia
 Whitten Soccer Complex, located at Belmont University, Nashville, Tennessee

Other uses
 Charles A. Whitten Medal, recognizes outstanding achievement in research on the form and dynamics of the Earth and planets
 Whitten effect, in ethology

See also
 Whiten (disambiguation)